Olukoya Ogen is a Nigerian professor of history, a Fellow of the Historical Society of Nigeria and former Provost of Adeyemi College of Education, Nigeria.

Education
Olukoya Ogen obtained his PhD degree in history from the University of Lagos as well as a Certificate in Trade, Growth and Poverty from the World Bank Institute, Washington DC in 2006. He was a Leventis Scholar at the University of London in 2008; a British Academy Visiting Fellow at the University of Birmingham in 2009; a Cadbury Visiting Fellow in 2010; and an American Council of Learned Societies Postdoctoral Fellow in 2011. He was also the Country Director and Co-Investigator of a European Research Council Grant from 2012 to 2017. He specialises in the sociocultural and economic history of Nigeria.

Professional and administrative career
Prior to joining Osun State University in 2009, he had stints at the University of Lagos, 2000–2001, Adekunle Ajasin University, 2001–2006, and Obafemi Awolowo University, 2006–2009. He was a guest researcher at Fourah Bay College, University of Sierra Leone in 2011, and was an ACLS Scholar-in-Residence at the University of Ibadan in 2012. He was appointed visiting senior research fellow at the University of Birmingham in 2012; visiting full research professor at Southern University, Baton Rouge, Louisiana from 2017-2020 ; and  Endowed Professor of Education by the American lCT University in Yaounde in 2018.

He served as the pioneer dean of the Faculty of Humanities at Osun State University from 2012 to 2014, and was appointed by the federal government as the provost of Adeyemi College of Education, Ondo, from 2014 to 2018. He was a federal government appointee on the governing council of the Federal Polytechnic, Ilaro from 2017-2020. He is currently a member of the TETfund National Research Fund Committee. In November 2018, the Board of Trustees of ICT University Foundation, USA appointed him as the chairman of the Implementation Committee of its proposed ICT University in Nigeria.

Honours and recognitions
He is a recipient of two Lifetime Achievement Awards, he also received a Letter of Commendation from the 8th Senate of the Federal Republic of Nigeria for accountability and integrity after emerging as the best Provost in Nigeria for 2017. He was appointed Honorary Mayor of the City of Baton Rouge, Louisiana in 2017. In 2019, won the Ali Mazrui Prize for Excellence in Scholarship and Academic Leadership. He is also a recipient of a Platinum Benefactor prize and University Super Hero award by the University of Medical Sciences, Ondo City in 2017 and 2019 respectively.

References

External links
Biography of Professor Olukoya Ogen

Academic staff of Adeyemi College of Education
University of Lagos alumni
Adeyemi College of Education alumni
1968 births
Living people
People from Ondo State